Maksimir Stadium is a multi-use stadium in Zagreb, Croatia. It takes its name from the surrounding neighbourhood of Maksimir. The venue is primarily the home of Dinamo Zagreb, the top club of the country with 23 league titles, but it is also the home venue of the Croatia national football team. First opened in 1912, it has undergone many revamps, and its current layout dates from a 1997 rebuilding. The stadium also sometimes hosts other events such as rock concerts.

History

The construction and the early years
With the rising popularity of the sport in Zagreb, the local football club HAŠK, which was one of the first multi-sports club in Croatia, decided to build a new stadium for their club. They bought the ground in the Svetice neighbourhood in Zagreb, which lies on the opposite side of the Maksimir Park, from the Archdiocese of Zagreb. HAŠK built a wooden stand with a capacity of 6,000, which was also the first ground with a proper stand in Zagreb at that time. The stadium was opened on 5 May 1912, and at the opening ceremony of the new stadium, HAŠK and their city rival, HŠK Građanski Zagreb, played several friendly matches to commemorate the opening.

Due to the close relationship and alliance of HAŠK and HŠK Građanski Zagreb and the latter one playing at the Stadion Koturaška, which was in a poor state, Građanski also started playing their home matches at the new Stadium Maksimir. 

On 26 May 1941, a representative of the Ustashe fascist government of the Independent State of Croatia addressed young Zagreb students at their meeting at the Maksimir Stadium, and at one point ordered the Serbian and Jewish students to be segregated, but the children disobeyed. Soon afterwards, in June 1941, rebel youths burned the stadium down. In 1977, a movie Operation Stadium was made to commemorate the segregation incident.

After World War II and the development
After World War II, HAŠK and Građanski got dissolved by the newly established communist regime of Yugoslavia and a new club, FD Dinamo Zagreb, inherited the clubs' colours, honours and the ground and is, therefore, the direct successor of HAŠK and HŠK Građanski Zagreb.

When the UEFA Euro 1976 final tournament was held in Yugoslavia, Maksimir hosted the Netherlands v. Czechoslovakia semi-final match and the Netherlands v. Yugoslavia third place match.

Maksimir was the central venue for the 1987 Summer Universiade hosted by the city of Zagreb.

In 1990, several events happened at Maksimir. On 13 May, the Dinamo Zagreb–Red Star Belgrade riot took place, an infamous riot involving Dinamo Zagreb and Red Star Belgrade supporters. The last match of the Yugoslavia national football team was hosted at Maksimir on 3 June. On 17 October of the same year, Croatia played the United States in what was Croatia's first match in the modern era.

In modern times
In 1998, plans were made for a massive renovation, and the first phase started the same year. The old northern stand was demolished and a new one built within a year. This renovation increased Maksimir's seating capacity to 38,079.

After 1992, for 16 years the Croatian football team had a proud unbeaten record at this stadium in any competitive match, however, on 10 September 2008 (two years after suffering a 2–0 defeat at the same venue) England became the first team to beat Croatia in Zagreb, winning 4–1, ending a thirty match undefeated streak.

In the summer of 2011, a little, but much needed "facelifting" was made on the stadium. All seats were replaced, a new drainage system, under-soil heating and automatic watering were installed along with a new turf, the athletic track was covered with blue artificial grass and all brick surfaces were covered in blue cloth.

2020 earthquake

The earthquake, which happened on the morning of 22 March 2020, damaged the structural stability of the stadium. After an inspection by a structural engineer, the Maksimir stadium was deemed "temporarily unusable". The eastern stand, which is also the biggest single stand by capacity, took the most damage and is awaiting the final decision following a detailed building inspection. While waiting, Dinamo is allowed to host matches on the Maksimir stadium, but with the eastern stand being closed for viewers.

Capacity per sector
Four stands (8 sectors) contribute to the total seating capacity of 35,423: 25.912 after east stand damage. 

North stand (up): 4,510
North stand (down): 4,950
North stand (VIP): 300
West stand (up): 5,101
West stand (down): 6,369
West stand (VIP): 748
East stand: 9,514 - closed due to damage from the earthquake
South stand: 3,931

International matches

Concerts
The stadium has also been used as the venue for some big concerts, including:
On 5 September 1990, David Bowie performed a sold-out concert as a part of his Sound+Vision Tour (1990).
In 2000, Zlatan Stipišić Gibonni performed a concert in front of 32,000 people, promoting his album Judi, zviri i beštimje (2000).
On 22 June 2005, Bijelo Dugme performed a reunion concert for a crowd of 70,000 people on their Tour 2005. (2005).
On 17 June 2007, Marko Perković Thompson performed a concert for a crowd of 70,000 people as a part of his Bilo jednom u Hrvatskoj Tour (2007).
On 9 and 10 August 2009, U2 performed two sold-out concerts for 124,012 people as a part of their U2 360° Tour (2009-2011).
On 8 June 2011, Bon Jovi performed a concert for a crowd of 33,698 people as a part of their Bon Jovi Live Tour, which supports the band's sixth compilation album, The Greatest Hits. (2011).
On 11 June 2012, Madonna was scheduled to perform a concert as a part of her MDNA Tour, but the concert was cancelled due to logistic reasons.
On 23 May 2013, Depeche Mode was scheduled to perform a concert as a part of their Delta Machine Tour, but the concert was changed to the Arena Zagreb due to logistic reasons.
On  13 August 2013, Robbie Williams performed a concert in front of 45,000 people, featuring Olly Murs as his opening act, as a part of Take the Crown Stadium Tour (2013).

Renovation plans

According to the 1998 plans, renovation was to include lowering the lawn and making the "ring" round the pitch in the place of running track and thus gain 16,000 new seats with the annex to the south stand with the final addition of a modern roof structure. Maksimir was to have 60,000 comfortable sitting places and was to be an exclusively football stadium like many others in Europe.

It has additionally been planned to build: new premises for Club's Management, Elegant "Blue Lounge", Big "Trophy room", football school premises, changing room, coach staff room, sports hall with gym, out patient clinic, restaurant, luxury hotel ("A" category) with 46 beds for visiting teams special importance will be given to the building which will connect west stand to the north stand. By this, all the conditions for hosting and organizing big European matches would be fulfilled, including UEFA offices, press club, press center, V.I.P. hospitality, etc. With that, the venue was to be one of the best equipped stadiums in Europe. However, in the beginning of the 2000s, the renovations were suspended.

As of December 2007, the public was awaiting the presentation of new stadium, and in 2008 city government presented two potential stadiums, new Maksimir and Vulkan (Volcano) which is supposed to be built on another location (Kajzerica) in Zagreb and old Maksimir should then be knocked down, the citizens were to choose which one they want on the referendum predicted to take place somewhere in the near future. However, the city government never made any progress with referendum or these plans and the stadium remains to be a problem to the city for a decade now.

There were talks, again, in 2018, after Croatia's historic success at the World Cup, that the stadium was going to be demolished and a new state of the art stadium would be built on the same place. In 2019, Dinamo Zagreb announced that they will demolish Maksimir and build a completely new stadium on their own, without the help of the Croatian Government, but needed the confirmation from the governing body of Zagreb and its mayor, Milan Bandić. Shortly after, it was announced that Dinamo Zagreb and the City of Zagreb will go in a joint collaboration to build a new stadium. The new stadium was supposed to be built on the ground of the current Maksimir Stadium and it should have had a capacity of 30,000 spectators. The stadium would have had a garage, shopping centre, hotel and several fan corners. After the 2020 Zagreb earthquake, the talks were, once again, put on hold.

Between 1997 and 2015, a total of HRK 800 million (c. €108 million) has been spent renovating the stadium.

As of October 2022, Marko Milić (the representor of the Croatian government), has guaranteed that there will be a new Maksimir built with help of the government and the city of Zagreb.

Kajzerica proposal

Stadion Kajzerica was a proposed new football stadium to be built in the Kajzerica neighborhood in Zagreb, intended to replace Stadion Maksimir as the home of the Croatia national football team and Dinamo Zagreb.

The design competition for the new stadium was won by architect Hrvoje Njirić in May 2008. The winning design, nicknamed The Blue Volcano by the press, would have a capacity of 55,000 and would include a blue-coloured polycarbonate dome exterior and a cloud-like structure suspended above the stadium covered in photovoltaic panels.

The project had originally been intended to go ahead after it gained approval in a public referendum in which citizens of Zagreb would vote whether they would rather have the current Stadion Maksimir torn down and re-built in the same location (which would cost at least 264 million euros, according to offers submitted by construction companies) or replaced by an entirely new stadium at Kajzerica (whose construction cost is still unknown).

According to the initial plan, the first option would include building a smaller venue at Kajzerica between 2009 and 2011, which would then be used to host Dinamo Zagreb's matches while Maksimir stadium is undergoing rebuilding in the period between 2011 and 2014. The other option would include building the purpose-built 55,000 capacity Blue Volcano at Kajzerica, which would then become the Blues' permanent home.

However, the referendum about the stadium, which had originally been scheduled for June 2008, was postponed several times since and has not been held.

In October 2012, the project was abandoned, to be briefly revived in 2013 with an eye to a possible UEFA Euro 2020 bid, and again in 2018, following Croatia's historic success in the World Cup.

References

External links

 
 GNK Dinamo Zagreb official website
 GNK Dinamo Zagreb stadium
 

 

Sports venues in Zagreb
Football venues in Croatia
Stadion Maksimir
UEFA Euro 1976 stadiums
National stadiums
Athletics (track and field) venues in Croatia
Football venues in Yugoslavia
Athletics (track and field) venues in Yugoslavia
Sports venues completed in 1912
Music venues completed in 1912
1912 establishments in Croatia
Maksimir